Na Moral (Portuguese for In Moral) is a Brazilian talk show broadcast by Rede Globo since July 5, 2012 and hosted by Pedro Bial.  The show includes the participation of three people which complement the theme, 50 people in an audience and a DJ.

References 

Rede Globo original programming
Brazilian television series
2012 in Brazilian television